Manado United 9 or simply known as Manado United is an Indonesian football club based in Manado, North Sulawesi. The team plays in Liga Primer Indonesia.

Team Officials

The Meaning of Logo

The ship steering wheel signifies the wheel of a large vessel capable of passing big storms.

Images of water and fish symbolize the city of Manado as a Marine City. Football is expected to help raise the image of Manado as Marine City. Meanwhile, the number nine signifies the 9 united tribes of Minahasa and its 9 districts.

Current squad

Supporters
Manado United's supporters call themselves "The Man" and "Manado United Fans Club (MUFC)".

Kit Supplier
 Joma (since 2011)

2011 LPI results

* Manado United's scores listed first

References

 http://www.tribunnews.com/2011/01/08/tujuh-pemain-asing-perkuat-manado-united

External links
Manado United at Liga Primer Indonesia official website

Defunct football clubs in Indonesia
Football clubs in Indonesia
Association football clubs established in 2010
2010 establishments in Indonesia
2011 disestablishments in Indonesia